Dethawia is a genus of flowering plants belonging to the family Apiaceae.

Its native range is Pyrenees.

Species:
 Dethawia splendens (Lapeyr.) Kerguélen

References

Apiaceae
Apiaceae genera